Kanichukulangara Temple (referred to as Kanichukulangara Bhagwathy Temple)  is a famous temple of the Hindu mother goddess Bhagawathi. The temple is located near Cherthala in Alappuzha district of Kerala in India. The main festival is celebrated on the day of "Thiruvonam" in the Malayalam month "Kumbham". The temple is famous for 'Chikkara', 'Pongala', 'Thooka Chadu' and Fire Works . The temple is 7.5 km away from Cherthala and 17 km away from Alappuzha.

References 

Hindu temples in Alappuzha district
Devi temples in Kerala